Yemen has only competed at the Summer Olympic Games, sending athletes to every edition since its first participation in 1992. Before the Yemeni unification in 1990, Yemenite athletes had competed at the Games as early as 1984, representing North Yemen (the Yemen Arab Republic; 1984 and 1988) or South Yemen (People's Democratic Republic of Yemen; 1988). Yemen has not yet won any Olympic medal.

The Yemen Olympic Committee was formed in 1971 and recognized by the International Olympic Committee in 1981.

Medal tables

Medals by Summer Games

See also
 Yemen at the Paralympics
 List of flag bearers for Yemen at the Olympics

External links
 
 
 
 
 
 
 
 

 
Olympics